Jeffrey David Johnson (born 26 November 1953) is a Welsh former footballer. In addition to his club career – playing over 400 games in the Football League, he also represented his country at youth and under-23 level.

He began his career at Manchester City in 1970, and played on loan at Swansea City in 1972, before joining Crystal Palace the following year. He moved on to Sheffield Wednesday in 1976, and was voted Player of the Year in 1980, and helped the club to win promotion out of the Third Division in 1979–80. He signed with Newport County in 1981, before moving on to Gillingham the next year. He joined Port Vale in June 1985, and played a minor role in the club's promotion out of the Fourth Division, before he joined non-league Barrow in May 1986.

Career
Johnson started his professional career with Manchester City in 1970, when Joe Mercer was finishing his six-year reign. He made six First Division appearances in 1970–71, 1971–72 and 1972–73. He also had a lengthy spell on loan at Swansea City, playing 38 games in the Third Division. In December 1973, Johnson rejoined his former Manchester City manager, Malcolm Allison, at Crystal Palace in December 1973. Palace suffered relegation from the Second Division in 1973–74. Palace were four points off the promotion places in 1974–75 and three points shy of the promotion places in 1975–76, although Palace reached the FA Cup semi-final that year. Johnson made 26 league appearances that season and played in four out of eight games in the cup run. Johnson left Selhurst Park in July 1976, and moved on to Len Ashurst's Sheffield Wednesday, who finished six points behind Palace in 1976–77, who occupied the third and final promotion place. Jack Charlton then took over at Hillsborough, and Wednesday dropped to 14th in 1977–78 and 1978–79. Johnson was voted the club's Player of the Year in 1979–80, as Wednesday won promotion in third place. The club adapted comfortably to the Second Division in 1980–81, though at the end of the season, Johnson dropped back down a division to sign with Newport County, and was reunited with Len Ashurst at Somerton Park. Newport posted a 16th-place finish in 1981–82.

He then moved on to Keith Peacock's Gillingham, and became a key first team player at Priestfield Stadium. Gillingham finished 13th in the Third Division in 1982–83 and eighth in 1983–84, before missing out on the promotion places by one place and four points in 1984–85. He joined John Rudge's Port Vale in June 1985, making his debut on 17 August 1985 in a 1–0 defeat at Exeter City. He suffered a setback in October 1985 when he broke his foot. Unable to regain his first team spot with Port Vale, who went on to win promotion out of the Fourth Division in 1985–86, he was given a free transfer in May 1986, to Northern Premier League club Barrow. After leaving the game he spent many years as a taxi driver in Manchester.

Career statistics
Source:

Honours
Individual
Sheffield Wednesday F.C. Player of the Year: 1980

Sheffield Wednesday
Football League Third Division third-place promotion: 1979–80

Port Vale
Football League Fourth Division fourth-place promotion: 1985–86

References

1953 births
Living people
Welsh footballers
Association football midfielders
Footballers from Cardiff
Wales under-23 international footballers
Manchester City F.C. players
Swansea City A.F.C. players
Crystal Palace F.C. players
Sheffield Wednesday F.C. players
Newport County A.F.C. players
Gillingham F.C. players
Port Vale F.C. players
Barrow A.F.C. players
English Football League players
Northern Premier League players
British taxi drivers